Baildon Katowice was an ice hockey team from Katowice, Poland. They competed in the Polska Hokej Liga, the top level of ice hockey in Poland, until folding in 1982.

External links
 Profile on World Hockey

1920 establishments in Poland
1982 disestablishments in Poland
Ice hockey teams in Poland
Sport in Katowice